Sandra Trattnigg (born 14 November 1976, Klagenfurt) is an Austrian opera and concert soprano.

Life 
Trattnigg was born in Klagenfurt in South Carinthia in 1976 and has been living in Zürich since 2005. She received her musical training at the University of Music and Performing Arts in Vienna at Helena Lazarska (vocal coach) as well as Edith Mathis (Song and Oratorio). In 2001, she won the „Kammeroper Schloss Rheinsberg“ competition (Berlin). In 2002, she was the laureate of the „Musica Juventutis“ competition of the Konzerthaus Vienna and received a sponsorship award from the Mozart University of Salzburg in 2003.

Sandra Trattnigg made her opera debut at the Schlosstheater Schönbrunn, singing Euridice in Gluck's Orfeo ed Euridice. She then continued to sing Cleopatra in Handel's Giulio Cesare in Egitto in Vienna, Donna Elvira in Mozart's Don Giovanni at the chamber opera at Schloss Rheinsberg, Pamina in his Die Zauberflöte, Mařenka in Smetana's The Bartered Bride and Antonia in Offenbach's The Tales of Hoffmann at the opera Klosterneuburg as well as Micaëla in Bizet's Carmen at the municipal theatre of Klagenfurt.
She was then engaged at the Zurich Opera by Nikolaus Harnoncourt, where she has performed in roles such as Pamina, First Lady, Drusilla, Celia, Anna Geppone, First Flower Girl, The Duchess of Parma, Solveig, Marzelline, Micaëla, Vitellia, Rosalinde, Elisabeth und Gutrune. She sang in the Palau de les Arts in Valencia as Marzelline (Fidelio) conducted by Zubin Mehta and performed brilliantly as the main part in the premiere of Anno Schreier's Die Stadt der Blinden as well as Regina in Hindemith's Mathis der Maler in Zurich. In Summer 2012, she sang in The Magic Flute at the Salzburg Festival and performed as Freia in Rheingold in Leipzig.

Sandra Trattnigg is also a concert singer. Appearances in all important European musical centers reflect her broad repertoire, her frequent engagements as well as her musical versatility: The Salzburg Festival, the Carinthian Summer, Konzerthaus and Musikverein Vienna, Tonhalle Zurich or the Gewandhaus in Leipzig being only some of her various stations in Europe. 2011 she sang the St. Luke passion of Krzysztof Penderecki along with the Dresden Philharmonic. Conducted by Ingo Metzmacher, Trattnigg also sung Martha in a rendition of Schubert's Lazarus with the German Symphony Orchestra Berlin. Up to now, Sandra Trattnigg has worked with conductors such as Nikolaus Harnoncourt, Zubin Mehta, Franz Welser-Möst, Fabio Luisi, Bernard Haitink, Nello Santi, Christian Thielemann, Marc Minkowski, Thomas Rösner, Andrés Orozco-Estrada, Ivor Bolton, Christoph von Dohnányi, Philippe Jordan, Ingo Metzmacher, Daniele Gatti, Ulf Schirmer, Plácido Domingo and Krzysztof Penderecki.

Repertoire (selection)

Opera repertoire 
 Ludwig van Beethoven: Fidelio - Marzelline
 Georges Bizet: Carmen - Michaela
 Ferruccio Busoni: Doktor Faust - Herzogin von Parma
 Christoph Willibald Gluck: Orpheus ed Euridice - Euridice
 HK Gruber: Der Herrr Nordwind - Anna Geppone
 Paul Hindemith: Mathis der Maler - Regina
 Claudio Monteverdi: L'incoronazione di Poppea - Drusilla
 Wolfgang Amadeus Mozart: Die Zauberflöte - Pamina / Erste Dame
 Wolfgang Amadeus Mozart: Don Giovanni - Donna Elvira
 Wolfgang Amadeus Mozart: Così fan tutte - Fiordiligi
 Wolfgang Amadeus Mozart: La clemenza di Tito - Vitellia
 Wolfgang Amadeus Mozart: Il re pastore - Tamiri
 Jacques Offenbach: Les Contes d'Hoffmann - Antonia
 Anno Schreier: Die Stadt der Blinden - Frau des Augenarztes
 Bedřich Smetana: Die verkaufte Braut - Marie
 Johann Strauss: Die Fledermaus - Rosalinde
 Richard Strauss: Ariadne auf Naxos - Echo
 Richard Strauss: Die Frau ohne Schatten - Stimme des Falken / Hüter der Schwelle
 Richard Wagner: Tannhäuser - Elisabeth
 Richard Wagner: Götterdämmerung - Gutrune / III Norne
 Richard Wagner: Parsifal - 1. Blumenmädchen
 Richard Wagner: Die Walküre - Ortlinde
 Richard Wagner: Rheingold - Freia
 Carl Maria von Weber: Der Freischütz- Agathe
 Riccardo Zandonai: Francesca da Rimini - Garsenda

Concert repertoire 
 Johann Sebastian Bach: Weihnachtsoratorium
 Johann Sebastian Bach: Matthäuspassion
 Johann Sebastian Bach: Kantaten BWV 21, 89, 93, 155, 163, 193, 199
 Ludwig van Beethoven: 9. Sinfonie
 Ludwig van Beethoven: Egmont op. 84
 Ludwig van Beethoven: Messe in C-Dur
 Anton Bruckner: Messe f-Moll
 Gabriel Fauré: Requiem
 Edvard Grieg: Peer Gynt - Solveig
 Georg Friedrich Händel: Solomon - The Queen of Sheba
 Joseph Haydn: Scena di Berenice
 Gustav Mahler: 4. Sinfonie - Die himmlischen Freuden
 Gustav Mahler: 8. Sinfonie - Mater Gloriosa
 Gustav Mahler: Lieder aus des Knaben Wunderhorn
 Felix Mendelssohn Bartholdy: Elias
 Wolfgang Amadeus Mozart: Requiem
 Wolfgang Amadeus Mozart: Missa Brevis D-Dur
 Wolfgang Amadeus Mozart: Krönungsmesse
 Wolfgang Amadeus Mozart: Große Messe in c-Moll - Sopran I
 Wolfgang Amadeus Mozart: Vesperae solennes de confessore
 Krzysztof Penderecki: 7. Sinfonie („Seven Gates of Jerusalem“)
 Krzysztof Penderecki: Lukaspassion
 Giovanni Battista Pergolesi: Stabat mater
 Franz Schmidt: Das Buch mit sieben Siegeln
 Franz Schubert: Messe in G-Dur
 Franz Schubert: Messe in As-Dur
 Franz Schubert: diverse Orchesterlieder
 Franz Schubert: Lazarus - Martha
 Richard Strauss: Vier letzte Lieder
 Richard Strauss: diverse Orchesterlieder
 Alexander Zemlinsky: Lyrische Symphonie

Discography (selection)

CD recordings 
 2006 Franz Schubert - Messe in As-Dur
 2006 Gustav Mahler - 4. Symphonie, Fabio Luisi (Conductor) and MDR Sinfonieorchester
 2008 Franz Schmidt - Das Buch mit sieben Siegeln

DVD recordings 
 2006 Ferruccio Busoni - Doktor Faust, Philippe Jordan (Conductor)
 2007 Wolfgang Amadeus Mozart - Die Zauberflöte, Nikolaus Harnoncourt (Conductor)
 2007 Franz Schubert - Fierrabras, Franz Welser-Möst (Conductor)
 2007 Richard Wagner - Parsifal, Bernard Haitink (Conductor)
 2007 Richard Strauss - Ariadne auf Naxos, Christoph von Dohnányi (Conductor)
 2007 Benjamin Britten - Peter Grimes, Franz Welser-Möst (Conductor)
 2010 Ludwig van Beethoven - Fidelio, Bernard Haitink (Conductor)
 2014 Wolfgang Amadeus Mozart - Die Zauberflöte, Nikolaus Harnoncourt (Conductor)

Awards 
2005 Women's Culture Award for Music in Carinthia ("Frauenkulturpreis für Musik des Landes Kärnten (Austria)" in German)

External links 
 
 Official webseite
 Operabase
 YouTube

1976 births
Living people
Austrian operatic sopranos
Musicians from Klagenfurt
21st-century Austrian  women opera singers